Tim White (4 April 1952 – 6 April 2020) was a British painter, best known for his science fiction and fantasy book covers, record covers and magazine illustrations.  He also designed jewellery to complement some of his paintings.

Born in Erith, Kent, White studied at the Medway College of Art between 1968 and 1972. Following this, he spent two years working for various advertising studios, until he received his first book cover commission in 1974, for Arthur C Clarke's The Other Side of the Sky. He later provided covers for authors including Robert A. Heinlein, Frank Herbert, August Derleth, H. P. Lovecraft, Piers Anthony and Bruce Sterling. He died on 6 April 2020.

Style
In A Biographical Dictionary of Science Fiction and Fantasy Artists, Robert Weinberg says, "White combines superlative detail with a largely figurative approach to his work and creates a totally realistic image of his landscape of the imagination." The Encyclopedia of Science Fiction says, "White has been celebrated as a representative of a new school of super-realists that began shaping British [science fiction] art in the mid-1970s", but notes that he has been  "relatively inactive since the year 2000".

Selected works
The Science Fiction and Fantasy World of Tim White (1981)
Mouches (1983)
Chiaroscuro (1988)
Mirror of Dreams (1994)

References

External links
 
 Tim White at The Encyclopedia of Science Fiction

1952 births
2020 deaths
20th-century British painters
British illustrators
British male painters
British speculative fiction artists
Fantasy artists
Science fiction artists
BSFA Award for Best Artwork winner
20th-century British male artists